Parshuram may refer to:

Places
 Parshuram, Bangladesh
 Parshuram, Dadeldhura, a municipality in Nepal
 Parshuram Upazila, a district (upazila) in Bangladesh

People
 Parashuram, Bengali Writer
 Parshuram Basnet, Nepalese don
 Parshuram Gangwar (1937–2015), an Indian politician
 Parshuram Ballal Godbole (1799–1874), a Marathi lexicographer, editor, and translator
 Parshuram Megi Gurung, Nepalese communist politician
 Parshuram Mishra (1894–1981), an Indian botanist and academic
 Parshuram Pant Pratinidhi (1160-1718), a governor in the Maratha Empire

Hindu Pilgrimage Sites
 Parshuram Kund, Famous Hindu Pilgrimage Site in Arunachal Pradesh, India
 Parshuram Mahadev Temple, a Hindu temple in Rajasthan, India
 Parshuram Temple, Chiplun, a Hindu temple in Maharashtra

Films
 Bhagwan Parshuram, a 1970 Indian film

See also
 Parashurama (disambiguation)